Phrourarch or  Phrourarchos is a Greek military title, meaning garrison commander. Athenians controlled their overseas empire with the episcopi and phrourarchs. The term was widely used by the Macedonian and later Hellenistic armies. Regarding the Spartans, it is not clear if phrourarch was the specific Spartan term. Phroura (garrison) is reported to be a Spartan term for 'a small mobile or expeditionary force'. The title for the governor of the garrisoned cities under the Spartan hegemony was harmost.

References

From Cyrus to Alexander By Pierre Briant, Eisenbrauns Page 75  
The administration of the Ptólemaic possessions outside Egypt By Roger S. Bagnall Page 50 
Aspects of Greek history, 750-323 BC By Terry Buckley Page 289 
The Athenian empire By Russell Meiggs pages 113 212 214 

 
Ancient Greek titles
Military ranks of ancient Greece
Military ranks of Greece
Military ranks of ancient Macedon
Macedonia (ancient kingdom)
Athenian Empire